Between Earth and Sky is a fantasy novel series by Rebecca Roanhorse. It currently comprises two novels: Black Sun (2020) and Fevered Star (2022). It is an epic fantasy series inspired by various pre-Columbian American cultures. Black Sun won the 2021 Alex Award and the 2021 Ignyte Award for Best Adult Novel; it was additionally nominated for the Locus Award for Best Fantasy Novel, Nebula Award for Best Novel, and Hugo Award for Best Novel.

Plot

Prior to the series

Three hundred years prior to the main story, the War of the Spear began after a spearwoman of Hokaia became the first dreamwalker. She led a conquering army across the continent of the Meridian, but was ultimately defeated. At the conclusion of the war, the Treaty of Hokaia established the Watchers, a quasi-religious institution in the city of Tova. The four great cities agreed to ban magic and the worship of all gods. In Tova, the Odohaa cult continued to worship the Crow God in secret. Decades before the story, the Watchers massacred many members of the Carrion Crow clan in an event that became known as the Night of Knives.

Black Sun

Serapio of the Carrion Crow family is blinded and scarred in a religious ritual. He becomes the new incarnation of the Crow God. Years later, Captain Xiala is hired to transport him to the city of Tova by a man named Balam. Xiala's crew mutinies after learning that she has magical powers. Serapio summons an army of crows to kill the crew and save her.

In Tova, Naranpa serves as the Sun Priest, head of the Watchers. Yatliza, leader of the Carrion Crow, dies mysteriously. Her son Okoa returns home to Tova and attempts to prevent conflict with the Watchers. At her funeral, a riot breaks out, and Okoa is falsely accused of an attempted assassination on Naranpa. The Watchers prepare for war with the Odohaa cult. Naranpa is ousted from her position as Sun Priest; her bodyguard and former lover Iktan supports this ouster. Naranpa seeks help from her brother Denaochi and Zataya, a witch. Rogue priests kill Naranpa; Zataya resurrects her.

Xiala and Serapio arrive in Tova. During an eclipse, Serapio kills most of the Watchers at Sun Rock. He is surprised to discover that Naranpa, the true Sun priest, is not there. He is severely injured but is rescued by Okoa. Time seems to freeze and a black sun hangs over Tova as the new year begins.

Fevered Star

In Cuecola, Balam learns to practice dreamwalking, which has been forbidden since the Treaty of Hokaia. Now that the Watchers are dead and the Treaty is broken, a power vacuum opens in the continent of the Meridian. Balam calls a meeting in the city of Hokaia. He plans to place the Golden Eagle clan in charge of Tova. He also plans to kill Serapio, whose survival was not intended.

In Tova, Naranpa meets with Denaochi. He intends to set her up as a symbol of resistance against the Carrion Crow clan. Serapio and Okoa return to the Carrion Crow district and meet with Okoa’s sister Esa, the clan’s new matron. Serapio quarrels with the leaders of the Carrion Crow about their plans for the future of Tova. Xiala goes to the Crow district, where she meets Iktan; they escape the district together and join the Golden Eagle clan on their journey to the meeting in Hokaia. Xiala learns that Iktan orchestrated Yatliza’s death and that the Golden Eagle clan was behind the assassination attempt on Naranpa. Xiala confesses to Iktan that she has been exiled from Teek after killing her own mother. When Xiala reaches Hokaia, she learns that her mother is still alive. She is ordered to return to Teek, but she agrees to spy on her mother for Balam.

Naranpa calls a meeting of all the Sky Made clans, where she reestablishes the Coyote clan and accuses Golden Eagle of treachery. Conflict erupts and Denaochi is killed.  Serapio and Naranpa fight to a draw at Sun Rock. Naranpa heals Serapio’s wound and leaves the city. Serapio forms his own army from the Odohaa cult, builds a magical palace, and declares his intent to rule over the entire city rather than just the Carrion Crow clan.

Style
There are four point-of-view characters in Black Sun: Serapio, Xiala, Okoa, and Naranpa. The present-day timeline is interrupted with frequent flashbacks.

Major themes
Though Black Sun features many queer characters and has been praised for its inclusivity, a reviewer for SyFy pointed out that "queerness" is a product of white supremacy and colonization. In many pre-Columbian civilizations, queer identities would not be considered "other" but would be considered normal parts of those societies. Xiala's bisexuality is used to highlight the varying degrees of acceptance among different cultures. Other characters are non-binary and use neopronouns, and this is accepted in most cities in Black Sun's world.

Background
Roanhorse researched Southeast Asian, Native American, and Mesoamerican civilizations while writing Black Sun. She wanted to write fiction that was different from the traditional European settings of epic fantasy novels. She started by writing the character of Xiala, and stated that "all the other characters started to come together" afterwards.

Adaptation
In December 2021, it was reported that AMC Studios will be adapting Black Sun into a television series with Roanhorse and Angela Kang as executive producers.

Reception

Black Sun received positive critical reviews with a "Rave" rating from the book review aggregator Book Marks based on eight independent reviews. Kirkus Reviews praised the characterization and political intrigue, calling it "the next big thing". The book was praised for its characterization and action sequences, as well as its positive and nuanced portrayal of queer characters. A reviewer for Locus praised her "awareness and respect" when writing fictionalized versions of Indigenous cultures.

Black Sun and Roanhorse's other books have received mixed reviews from Native American commentators. Some have criticized her for cultural appropriation in her portrayals of Indigenous communities. Others have praised her for "uncolonizing" fantasy literature.

Fevered Star received a positive review from Kirkus Reviews, which called it "an excellent second installment". It received a starred review from Library Journal, which called the novel "amazingly complex". Writing for Tor.com, Angela Maria Spring gave the second book a moderately positive review. She praised the complex plot and felt that Naranpa's character arc was the strongest of all of the characters, but felt that the pacing was slow and that the novel suffered from Serapio's separation from Xiala.

Footnotes

References

2020 American novels
2020 fantasy novels
Fictional blind characters
LGBT speculative fiction novels
Native American novels
2020s LGBT novels
Saga Press books